Karl Spillman Forester (May 2, 1940 – March 29, 2014) was a United States district judge of the United States District Court for the Eastern District of Kentucky.

Education and career

Born on May 2, 1940, in Harlan, Kentucky, Forester received a Bachelor of Arts from the University of Kentucky in 1962 and a Juris Doctor from the University of Kentucky College of Law in 1966. He was in private practice in Harlan from 1966 to 1988.

Federal judicial service

Forester was nominated by President Ronald Reagan on March 30, 1988, to the United States District Court for the Eastern District of Kentucky, to a new seat authorized by 71 Stat. 586. He was confirmed by the United States Senate on July 26, 1988, and received commission on July 27, 1988. He served as Chief Judge from 2001 to 2005. He assumed senior status on May 2, 2005. His service terminated on March 29, 2014, due to death.

Death

Forester died on March 29, 2014 in Lexington, Kentucky at the age of 73.

References

Sources
 
 Judge Forester's Homepage
 The Robing Room- Rate Judge Forrester
 "Kentucky.com" Federal judge rules in favor of plane crash widow, October 13, 2009
 "Kentucky.com" Federal judge wants to limit pretrial publicity, July 9, 2009
 "Lexington Herald-Leader" Bribery charges dismissed in bid-rigging case, January 27, 2010
 "Judge Forester Financial Disclosures"
 "Karl Forester Political Contributions"

1940 births
2014 deaths
People from Harlan, Kentucky
Judges of the United States District Court for the Eastern District of Kentucky
United States district court judges appointed by Ronald Reagan
20th-century American judges
University of Kentucky alumni
University of Kentucky College of Law alumni